Insufficiency may refer to:

Medical conditions

Circulatory system
Aortic insufficiency (AI), also known as aortic regurgitation (AR), the leaking of the aortic valve of the heart that causes blood to flow in reverse during ventricular diastole, from the aorta into the left ventricle
Arterial insufficiency, insufficient blood flow through the arteries typically caused by atherosclerosis
Arterial insufficiency ulcer (also known as "Ischemic ulcers"), mostly located on the lateral surface of the ankle or the distal digits
Chronic venous insufficiency or CVI is a medical condition where the leg veins cannot pump enough oxygen-poor blood back to the heart
Venous insufficiency ulceration, as well as stasis dermatitis, a skin condition that results from increased pressure in the venous system of the lower leg
Placental insufficiency, insufficient blood flow to the placenta during pregnancy
Pulmonary valve insufficiency (or incompetence, or regurgitation) is a condition where the pulmonary valve is not strong enough to prevent backflow into the right ventricle
Tricuspid insufficiency, a valvular heart disease also called Tricuspid regurgitation, refers to the failure of the heart's tricuspid valve to close properly during systole
Vertebrobasilar insufficiency (VBI), or vertebral basilar ischemia, a temporary set of symptoms due to decreased blood flow in the posterior circulation of the brain

Endocrine system
Adrenal insufficiency, a condition in which the adrenal glands, located above the kidneys, do not produce adequate amounts of steroid hormones
Critical illness–related corticosteroid insufficiency, a form of adrenal insufficiency in critically ill patients whose blood corticosteroid levels are inadequate for the stress response they experience

Nervous system
Accommodative insufficiency (AI), the inability of the eye to focus properly on an object
Convergence insufficiency, a sensory and neuromuscular anomaly of the binocular vision system, characterized by an inability of the eyes to approach each other, or sustain convergence

Other medical conditions
Exocrine pancreatic insufficiency (EPI), the inability to properly digest food due to a lack of digestive enzymes made by the pancreas

Other uses
Motion triggered contact insufficiency (MTCI), the effect of increased contact resistance occurring during or after mechanical stress or movement of an electrical contact system